Bilopillia (translit.: Belopol`ye) is a city in Sumy Raion of Sumy Oblast of northeastern Ukraine. It was the administrative center of Bilopillia Raion until it was abolished on 18 July 2020. It is located close to Kursk Oblast of Russia. Population:  The city's ancient name is Vyr.

Geography 
Bilopillya railway station is situated in the south part of the city.

History 
Bilopillia was an important town in the Sumy Cossack regiment. It consisted of a town with 9 towers and a fort with 13 towers. In 1678 there were 53 Russian service people and 1,202 Cossacks. In 1681, the three villages of Krygu (in office), Vorozhba (2 kilometers from the city), and Pavlivka (5 km from the city) were assigned to Bilopillia.

Later, Bilopillia became a settlement (since 1791 – a town) in Sumskoy Uyezd in the Kharkov Governorate of the Russian Empire. 

In 1933 Bilopillia Machine-Building Plant was built here.

The settlement suffered as a result of the genocide of the Ukrainian people, conducted by the Government of the USSR in 1932–1933 and 1946–1947. [3] At least 2,000 people died during the Soviet-organized Holodomor of 1932–1933. During World War II, town was occupied by the German Army from 8 October 1941 to 3 September 1943. 

In January 1989 the population was 19,746 people.

In January 2013 the population was 16 731 people.

Gallery

References

Cities in Sumy Oblast
Sumsky Uyezd